Nu-Nation is a Russian nu metal/groove metal band based in Saint Petersburg.

History 
Nu-Nation was formed in 2009 by the musicians of several local bands who wanted to play groove metal in the vein of Soulfly. Their first long-play 'Wake Up', was released in 2012, and proved popular with fans of nu-metal and groove metal. Following this, the band had some line-up and style changing. Another album 'The Awakening' came out in 2014, it has a more extreme sound and darker atmosphere. In early 2016, the band released their last album, 'Insomnia', much more brutal but melodic as well, with a lot of music styles and elements mixed. The album received favorable reviews.

The band played live all around Europe, and shared the stage with Soulfly, Betraying the Martyrs, Ektomorf and many others.

Musical style 
Nu-Nation started as groove/nu-metal band influenced by Sepultura, Ektomorf, but later changed the style, becoming a kind of extreme metal with elements of groove metal, hardcore, death metal, black metal. The musicians cite  Iron Maiden, Korn, Dark Funeral, Behemoth as influences.

Members 
 Arthur Khlevnikov – vocals
 Alexander Korsak – guitars
 Denis Vasiliev – guitars
 Dmitri Chernykh – bass
 Alexei Kiyski – drums

Discography 

 Studio albums
 2012 — Wake Up
 2014 — The Awakening
 2016 — Insomnia

 EPs and singles
 2010 – Art Of Riot
 2014 – Oil
 2014 – Acceleration
 2015 – No Way Out
 2016 – Let Me Go (feat. Lena Scissorhands)

 Music videos
 2012 — 
 2012 — 
 2014 — 
 2016 —

References

External links 
 http://time-for-metal.eu/nu-nation-insomnia/
 Nu-Nation at Sound Rate
 http://cmfagency.tumblr.com/post/142399208906/album-review-nu-nation-insomnia-2016
 https://web.archive.org/web/20161111040801/http://dailymetal.com.ua/index.php/review/959-nu-nation-insomnia
 https://noizr.com/news/reviews/check-em-all-fresh-metal-releases-selection/:1051/
 https://web.archive.org/web/20161111041148/http://expansionradial.mx/nunationinsomnia/
 https://web.archive.org/web/20160810065330/http://www.deathbymetalstl.com/alexander-korsak-from-nu-nation.html

Russian metalcore musical groups